A peanut butter and jelly sandwich (PB&J) consists of peanut butter and fruit preserves—jelly—spread on bread. The sandwich may be open-faced, made of a single slice of bread folded over, or made using two slices of bread. The sandwich is popular in the United States, especially among children; a 2002 survey showed the average American will eat 1,500 peanut butter and jelly sandwiches before graduating from high school. There are many variations of the sandwich, starting with the basic peanut butter sandwich or jam sandwich.

Preparation 
In basic preparation methods, a layer of peanut butter is spread on one slice of bread and a layer of fruit preserves is spread on another before the two sides are sandwiched together. (Jelly is a fruit-based spread, made primarily from fruit juice boiled with a gelling agent and allowed to set, while jam contains crushed fruit and fruit pulp, heated with water and sugar and cooled until it sets with the aid of natural or added pectin.)

The water inherent to preserves can make the bread soggy, especially when the sandwich is prepared ahead of time as part of a bag lunch. To prevent this, the peanut butter can be spread first on both slices of bread. The fat in peanut butter will block the moisture from the preserves from entering the slices of bread. However, the preserves are now more mobile and can squirt out the sides. If the open sides are sealed, the preserves are thoroughly contained; this technique is utilized by the major manufacturers of sealed crustless sandwiches (e.g. "Uncrustables").

Variations 
There are many variations on the sandwich; for example, honey or sliced fruit can be substituted for the jelly component, e.g., a peanut butter and banana sandwich. 

Marshmallow fluff can also be substituted for the jelly, or added for extra flavor; this sandwich is called a "Fluffernutter".

The popularity of almond butter has inspired some to transition to "almond butter and jelly" sandwiches; other nut butters are less common. Seed butters, such as sunflower seed butter are also possible peanut butter substitutes. Cream cheese, substituted for the peanut butter, makes a "cream cheese and jelly" sandwich. Nutella is another possible spread.

History

Peanut butter was originally paired with a diverse set of savory foods, such as pimento, cheese, celery, Worcestershire sauce, watercress, saltines and toasted crackers. In a Good Housekeeping article published in May 1896, a recipe "urged homemakers to use a meat grinder to make peanut butter and spread the result on bread." The following month, the culinary magazine Table Talk published a "peanut butter sandwich" recipe.

The first known reference for a peanut butter and jelly sandwich appeared in the Boston Cooking School Magazine in 1901; it called for "three very thin layers of bread and two of filling, one of peanut paste, whatever brand you prefer, and currant or crabapple jelly for the other", and called it as "so far as I know original". In the early 20th century, this sandwich was adopted down the class structure as the price of peanut butter dropped. It became popular with children with the advent of sliced bread in the 1920s, which allowed them to make their own sandwiches easily.

Since World War II, both peanut butter and jelly have been found on US soldiers' military ration list.

National Peanut Butter and Jelly Day occurs annually in the United States on April 2.

Nutrition
A peanut butter and jelly sandwich that is made with two slices of white bread, two tablespoons each of peanut butter and grape jelly provides 403 kcal, 18 g fat, 58 g carbohydrates (mostly sugar), and 12 g protein, which is 27% of the Recommended Daily Intake of fat and 22% of calories.

While roughly 50% of the calories are from fat, most of them come from monounsaturated fat and polyunsaturated fats, which the American Heart Association considers beneficial to heart health.

See also

 Fool's Gold Loaf
 Peanut butter, banana and bacon sandwich
 List of sandwiches
 List of peanut dishes

References

External links

24 Fun Facts about Peanuts & Peanut Butter
Keep your peanut-butter-and-jelly sandwich from getting soggy 
Grilled Peanut Butter and Jelly Sandwich
History of Peanut Butter & Jelly Sandwich

1901 introductions
American sandwiches
Vegan cuisine
Peanut butter sandwiches
Food combinations
Jams and jellies